"Over and Over Again" is a 2015 song by Nathan Sykes.

"Over and Over Again" may also refer to:
"Over and Over Again" (Robby Valentine song), 1991
 "Over and Over Again", a 1935 song by Richard Rodgers and Lorenz Hart, from the musical Jumbo
 "Over and Over Again", a 1953 single by Alma Cogan and Les Howard
 "Over and Over Again", a 1956 song by the Moonglows from the Rock, Rock, Rock soundtrack
 "Over and Over Again", a 1963 song by Buck Owens and the Buckaroos, released in 1963 as the B-side of "Act Naturally"
 "Over and Over Again", a 1968 single by Stranger Cole
 "Over and Over Again", a 1970 single by John Walker
 "Over and Over Again", a 1991 song by the Smithereens from  Blow Up
 "Over and Over Again (Lost and Found)", a 2005 song by Clap Your Hands Say Yeah from their album Clap Your Hands Say Yeah
 "(Over and) Over Again", a 2007 song by Morgana Lefay from Aberrations of the Mind
 "Over and Over (and Over Again)", a 2008 song by Hale from Above, Over and Beyond
 "Say It (Over and Over Again)", a 1963 song by John Coltrane Quartet on their 1963 album Ballads

See also 
 Over and Over (disambiguation)
 Over Again (disambiguation)